Jackie McLeod (1930–2022) was a Canadian former ice hockey player and coach who played for the New York Rangers and coached Canada at the 1968 Winter Olympics.

Jack McLeod may also refer to:
 Jack McLeod (rugby league), New Zealand rugby league player who represented his country in 1937
 Jack McLeod (footballer, born 1926) (1926–2020), Australian rules footballer who played for Hawthorn
 Jack McLeod (footballer, born 1907) (1907–1974), Australian rules footballer who played for St Kilda

See also 
 John McLeod (disambiguation)